The Wreck of the Titan: Or, Futility is a novella written by Morgan Robertson and published as Futility in 1898, and revised as The Wreck of the Titan in 1912. It features a fictional British ocean liner Titan that sinks in the North Atlantic after striking an iceberg. The Titan and its sinking are famous for similarities to the passenger ship  and its sinking 14 years later. After the sinking of the Titanic the novel was reissued with some changes, particularly in the ship's gross tonnage.

Plot
The first half of Futility introduces hero John Rowland, a disgraced former US Navy officer. Now an alcoholic denigrated to the lowest ranks of society, he has been dismissed from the Navy and works as a deckhand on the Titan. One April night, the ship hits an iceberg and sinks, somewhat before the mid-point of the novel.

The second half of the story follows Rowland as he saves the young daughter of a former lover by jumping onto the iceberg with her. The pair find a lifeboat washed up on the iceberg and are eventually rescued by a passing ship. But the girl is recovered by her mother and Rowland is arrested for her kidnapping. A sympathetic magistrate discharges him and rebukes the mother for being unsympathetic to her daughter's savior. Rowland disappears from the world.

In a brief final chapter covering several years, Rowland works his way up from homeless and anonymous fisherman to a desk job and finally, two years after passing his civil service exam, to "a lucrative position under the Government".

A later edition includes a followup: Rowland receives a letter from the mother (who congratulates him and pleads for him to visit her) and from the girl.

Similarities to the Titanic
Although the novel was written before the RMS Titanic was even conceptualized, there are some uncanny similarities between the fictional and real-life versions. Like the Titanic, the fictional ship sank after wrecking on an iceberg in April in the North Atlantic, and there were not enough lifeboats for all the passengers. The Titan would have survived a head-on collision with the iceberg, but a glancing encounter did more extensive damage. After the Titanic sinking, some people credited Robertson with precognition and clairvoyance, which he denied. Scholars attribute the similarities to Robertson's extensive knowledge of shipbuilding and maritime trends.

In popular culture
Walter Lord's book A Night to Remember (1955), relating the Titanic wreck, begins with a summary of Robertson's novel.
The American anthology series Beyond Belief: Fact or Fiction used the story in the episode eleven segment entitled "Titan".
The comic À la recherche de Sir Malcolm (1984), by François Rivière and Floc'h, starts with an introduction which opens with a mention of Futility.
The novel can be found sitting on Carlson's armchair in the 1996 video game Titanic: Adventure Out of Time.
The 2010 Doctor Who audio drama The Wreck of the Titan by Barnaby Edwards connects the writing of Futility to the Titanic story through time travel.
Martin Gardner's book The Wreck of the Titanic Foretold? (1986)
The book was referenced in the television series One Step Beyond, in season 1, episode 2, entitled "Night of April 14th", which aired January 27, 1959.
In The League of Extraordinary Gentlemen fictional universe, the Titan serves as the Titanic fictional counterpart.
Robertson's book is referenced in the 2009 video game Nine Hours, Nine Persons, Nine Doors in regards to the game's setting.

See also
List of fictional ships
Synchronicity
How the Mail Steamer Went Down in Mid Atlantic by a Survivor – 1886 short story written to warn about ships which lack lifeboat capacity

References

Further reading

External links

The Wreck of the Titan by Morgan Robertson
Online edition (250-page novel, 1912, facsimile edition)

1898 American novels
American novellas
Coincidence
Novels set on ships
RMS Titanic